The Bahamas Stakes was an American Thoroughbred horse race run annually in January at Hialeah Park Race Track in Hialeah, Florida. A seven furlong race on dirt, it was the first important test of the calendar year for newly turned three-year-olds. The race was used by prospective U.S. Triple Crown contenders as a stepping stone to the Everglades and Flamingo Stakes at the Hialeah track. Reflected Glory (1967) and Pistols and Roses (1992), swept all three events.

Inaugurated in 1934 as the Bahamas Handicap, it was run in two divisions in 1952, 1953, and 1969.

By the mid-1980s, the racing dates available to Hialeah Park track forced a rescheduling of the race and as such it would rarely be contested by Triple Crown hopefuls. Hialeah Park closed permanently after the 2001 racing season.

Racenotes
The 1937 winner, No Sir, was owned and trained by twenty-three-year-old Mary Hirsch who on April 2, 1935 became the first female to receive a trainers license.

The great Bold Ruler equalled the track record in his 1957 win. His mark was matched by Sir Gaylord in 1962 and then broken by New Prospect in 1972.

Four horses who were beaten in the Bahamas Stakes went on to win the Kentucky Derby:
 Tim Tam (1958)
 Venetian Way (1960)
 Carry Back (1961)
 Forward Pass (1968)

Winners

 † Run November 28, 1987.

References

Horse races in Florida
Graded stakes races in the United States
Discontinued horse races
Recurring sporting events established in 1934
Recurring sporting events disestablished in 2001
1934 establishments in Florida
2001 disestablishments in Florida